Ferdinandea buccata is a species of syrphid fly in the family Syrphidae.

References

Further reading

External links

 

Diptera of North America
Hoverflies of North America

Eristalinae
Taxa named by Hermann Loew
Insects described in 1863